All Saints Ward is a three-member ward within Kettering Borough Council and is commonly regarded as a marginal ward between Conservatives and Labour. The ward was last fought at Borough Council level in the 2015 local council elections. Three Conservative councillors were elected: Cllr Lesley Thurland, Cllr James Burton and Cllr Greg Titcombe.

Councillors
Kettering Borough Council Elections 2011
Michael Brown (Conservative)
Michelle George (Labour)
Jonathan West (Labour)

Kettering Borough Council Elections 2011

Councillors
Kettering Borough Council Elections 2007
Chris Smith-Haynes (Conservative)
Greg Titcombe (Conservative)
Jonathan West (Labour)

Kettering Borough Council Elections 2003
Greg Titcombe (Conservative)
Chris Smith-Haynes (Conservative)

Kettering Borough Council Elections 1999
Sue Holmes (Labour) - served as Mayor from 2002-2003
David Threadgold (Labour)

Current Ward Boundaries (2007-)
Note: due to boundary changes, vote changes listed below are based on notional results.

Kettering Borough Council Elections 2007

Historic Ward Boundaries (1999-2007)

Kettering Borough Council Elections 2003

(Vote count shown is ward average)

See also
Kettering
Kettering Borough Council

Electoral wards in Kettering